The NYU Veterans Writing Workshop at New York University in Manhattan, New York is a free, non-partisan outreach program offered to the veteran community in and around New York City and is considered by some as the pre-eminent writing workshop for veterans.

History 

The workshop began in 2008, founded by former United States Ambassador to Ireland Jean Kennedy Smith.

Alumni 
Notable alumni of the workshop include:

Jason Everman
Phil Klay
Matt Gallagher
Roy Scranton

Prizes won by alumni 
NYU Veterans Writing Workshop alumni have thus far won 1 National Book Award and other literary honors.

References

External links 
Official website accessed 23 November 2016

American writers' organizations
Creative writing programs
New York University